The Washington Blue Legs played their first and only season in 1873 as a  member of the National Association of Professional Base Ball Players. They finished seventh in the league with a record of 8-31. It is uncertain if this team is the same franchise as either the 1872 Washington Nationals or the 1872 Washington Olympics. The Blue Legs' 1873 roster featured four players who started for the Washington Nationals in 1872--Paul Hines (LF), Holly Hollingshead (CF), Warren White (3B), and Oscar Bielaski (RF)--and two players who started for the Washington Olympics in 1872--Tommy Beals (2B) and John Glenn (C). Nick Young, who managed the Blue Legs in 1873, had managed the Olympics in 1872.

Regular season

Season standings

Record vs. opponents

Roster

Player stats

Batting
Note: G = Games played; AB = At bats; H = Hits; Avg. = Batting average; HR = Home runs; RBI = Runs batted in

Starting pitchers 
Note: G = Games pitched; IP = Innings pitched; W = Wins; L = Losses; ERA = Earned run average; SO = Strikeouts

References
1873 Washington Blue Legs season at Baseball Reference

Washington Blue Legs Season, 1873